The 2011–12 Scottish Junior Cup was the 126th season of the Scottish Junior Cup, the national knockout tournament for member clubs of the Scottish Junior Football Association. The competition is sponsored by Emirates and is known as The Emirates Junior Cup for sponsorship purposes.

164 clubs entered this season's tournament, an increase of two from 2010–11. The four new SJFA member clubs – Colony Park, Falkirk Juniors, Portgordon Victoria and Rossvale – made their first appearance. Missing from the previous season were Arbroath Sporting Club who had folded and Scone Thistle who were in abeyance.

Shotts Bon Accord won the trophy for the second time in their history, defeating cup holders Auchinleck Talbot, 2–1, in the final at Almondvale Stadium. Under a 2007 rule change, the Junior Cup winners (along with winners of the North, East and West regional leagues) qualify for the senior Scottish Cup; Shotts Bon Accord therefore competed in the 2012–13 Scottish Cup.

Calendar
The scheduled dates for each round of the 2011–12 tournament were as follows: The decision to move the first leg of the semifinals back one day to Sunday 15 April was made in March 2012.

Drawn matches are replayed the following weekend. Replays ending in a draw proceed direct to penalty shootout. Semifinals are played home and away over two legs.

First round
The First round draw took place at Hampden Park, Glasgow on 30 August 2011.

1 Tie played at Deveronvale F.C.

Replays

Second round
The Second round draw took place in the Pollok F.C. Social Club on 9 October 2011.

2 Tie switched to Whitehills F.C. after three postponements.
3 Tie played at Lugar Boswell Thistle F.C.
4 Forfar West End went into abeyance on 18 October 2011 and withdrew from all competitive matches.
5 Tie played at Glenafton Athletic F.C.
6 Tie switched to Darvel F.C. after three postponements.

Replays

7 Tie played at Alloa Athletic F.C.

Third round
The Third round draw took place in the offices of the Scottish Sun newspaper, Glasgow on 15 November 2011.

8 Tie played at Carluke Rovers F.C.
9 Tie played at Wishaw Sports Centre
10 Tie played at Alloa Athletic F.C.
11 Tie played at Petershill F.C.
12 Tie played at Broxburn Athletic F.C.
13 Tie played at Yoker Athletic F.C.
14 RAF Lossiemouth unable to fulfil re-arranged fixture due to festive leave and expelled from competition

Replays

15 Tie played at Broxburn Athletic F.C.
16 Tie played at Lugar Boswell Thistle F.C.

Fourth round
The Fourth round draw took place in the offices of the Evening Times newspaper on 15 December 2011.

Replays

Fifth round
The Fifth round draw took place live on Real Radio on Thursday 2 February 2012.

Replays

17 Tie played at Petershill F.C.

Quarter-finals
The draw for the Quarter-finals took place live on Real Radio on Thursday 1 March 2012.

Semifinals
The draw for the semifinals took place at Hampden Park on 28 March 2012.

First leg

Second leg

Final

References

External links
SJFA

4
Scottish Junior Cup seasons